Marcus Ryan Elliott (born April 24, 1984) is an American professional basketball player for the Gimnasia y Esgrima de Comodoro Rivadavia of the Liga Nacional de Básquet.

College career
Elliott had played his 2 years of junior college basketball at Okaloosa-Walton CC in NJCAA Division I. Moreover, he had experienced 2 years of college basketball at Louisiana Tech with 61 times of appearance for the team in NCAA Division I.

Professional career

Chile
Elliott was graduated from Louisiana Tech in 2007, after being a year of construction worker, Elliott began his professional career in a Chilean Liga Nacional de Básquetbol de Chile club CD Valdivia in September 2008.

Uruguay
In September 2009, after a year played in Chile, Elliott signed a Uruguayan Liga Uruguaya de Básquetbol club, Club Social y Deportivo Anastasia to continue his career.

Venezuela
In April 2010, after the year played in Uruguay, Elliott signed a Venezuelan Liga Profesional de Baloncesto club Panteras de Miranda for a short period.

Argentina
In August 2010, Elliott moved to an Argentinian La Liga Argentina de Básquet club Club Deportivo Libertad for 5 months.

Ecuador
In January 2011, Elliott moved to an Ecuadorian Liga Ecuatoriana de Baloncesto club, Club Deportivo Mavort and played with the team for the rest of the season and helped the team to win the champion of 2010–11 Liga Ecuatoriana de Baloncesto.

Back to Chile
In October 2011, Elliott had returned to Chile and signed for a Liga Nacional de Básquetbol de Chile club, Club Deportivo Liceo Mixto in 2011–12.

Back to Uruguay
In February 2012, Elliott had returned to Uruguay and signed for another Liga Uruguaya de Básquetbol club Club Atlético Welcome.

Back to Venezuela
In April 2012, Elliott had returned to Venezuela and signed for another Liga Profesional de Baloncesto club Guaiqueríes de Margarita.

Third times in Uruguay
In October 2012, Elliott had returned to Uruguay and signed for another Liga Uruguaya de Básquetbol club Club Atlético Olimpia for a season.

Mexico
In April 2013, Elliott had moved to play in Mexican Circuito de Baloncesto de la Costa del Pacífico, stayed with Garra Cañera de Navolato and Ángeles Guerreros de Acapulco.

Back to Argentina
In March 2014, Elliott had returned to Argentina and signed for a La Liga Argentina de Básquet club La Unión de Formosa.

Third times in Venezuela
In April 2014, after an unsuccessful trial in Argentina, Elliott had returned to Venezuela Liga Profesional de Baloncesto club Toros de Aragua.

Back to Mexico
In September 2014, Elliott had returned to Mexico and signed for another Circuito de Baloncesto de la Costa del Pacífico club Huracanes de Tampico.

Forth times in Uruguay
In September 2015, Elliott had returned to Uruguay and signed for another Liga Uruguaya de Básquetbol club Club Trouville.

Third times in Argentina
In February 2016, Elliott had returned to Argentina and signed for another La Liga Argentina de Básquet club San Lorenzo and helped the team to win the champion of 2015–16 Liga Nacional de Básquet.

Hong Kong
In November 2016, Elliott moved to Asia, and signed by an ASEAN Basketball League and Hong Kong A1 Division Championship club Hong Kong Eastern, moreover, he helped the team to win the champion of ABL 2017 and Hong Kong A1 2018.

Singapore
In September 2019, Elliott returned to the ASEAN Basketball League, signing with the Singapore Slingers.

References

External links
 NEXO Agency – Marcus Elliott
 basketball.realgm.com Profile
 basketball.asia-basket.com Profile

1984 births
Living people
American expatriate basketball people in Argentina
American expatriate basketball people in Chile
American expatriate basketball people in Ecuador
American expatriate basketball people in Hong Kong
American expatriate basketball people in Mexico
American expatriate basketball people in Uruguay
American expatriate basketball people in Venezuela
American expatriate sportspeople in Singapore
American men's basketball players
ASEAN Basketball League players
Basketball players from Florida
Club Atlético Welcome basketball players
Eastern Sports Club basketball players
Garra Cañera de Navolato players
Guaiqueríes de Margarita players
Huracanes de Tampico players
La Unión basketball players
Louisiana Tech Bulldogs basketball players
Northwest Florida State Raiders men's basketball players
Panteras de Miranda players
People from Fort Walton Beach, Florida
Point guards
San Lorenzo de Almagro (basketball) players
Singapore Slingers players
Shooting guards